Little Current may refer to:

Little Current, Ontario
Little Current (horse)

See also
Little Current Public School
Little Current Swing Bridge
Little Current Water Aerodrome